Ireneusz Kiejda (born 30 January 1964) is a Polish judoka. He competed in the men's extra-lightweight event at the 1988 Summer Olympics.

References

1964 births
Living people
Polish male judoka
Olympic judoka of Poland
Judoka at the 1988 Summer Olympics
People from Nowa Sól County